The Yugra State University (YUSU; , ЮГУ) is a public university in Khanty-Mansiysk, Russia.

History 
The university was founded in 2001 by the initiative of the Government of Khanty-Mansi Autonomous Okrug on the basis of branches of educational institutions existed in Khanty-Mansiysk: the Tyumen State Agricultural Academy, the Nizhnevartovsk State Pedagogical Institute, and the Siberian State Automobile and Highway Academy.

In 2003, a new main building was built for the university. At that time it became the tallest building in Khanty-Mansiysk.

In 2007, the university included the following state educational institutions: the Surgut Petroleum Technical School, the Nizhnevartovsk Petroleum Technical School, the Lyantor Petroleum Technical School, and the Nefteyugansk Industrial College. They became branches of the YUSU.

In 2013, the university became a center for training the Olympics 2014 volunteers.

Education 
The YUSU provides education of different qualification levels:
 secondary vocational education,
 higher professional education (Bachelor's degree and master's degree),
 post-graduate studies in a number of scientific areas.

In the university the education process is organized at four departments:
 the Institute of Humanities (Northern studies),
 the Institute of Digital Economy,
 the Institute of Oil and Gas,
 the Institute of Law.

The UNESCO Chair "Environmental Dynamics and Global Climate Change" functions on the basis of the university. The opening of the second UNESCO chair "Indigenous Peoples in the context of Globalization" is planned in the near future.

The university has four academic and one administrative buildings. Also there are the scientific library and the sports complex with classrooms, indoor swimming pool and gyms.

References

External links 
  

Universities in Russia